SDC Group/Balbala is a Djiboutian football club based in Balbala, Djibouti City. It currently plays in the top domestic Djibouti Premier League and is owned by Moussa Abdourahman Gabood.

References

External links
Soccerway – Club Profile

Football clubs in Djibouti